The 1927 Georgia Tech Golden Tornado football team represented the Georgia Tech Golden Tornado of the Georgia Institute of Technology during the 1927 Southern Conference football season. A member of the Southern Conference (SoCon), Georgia Tech was coached by William Alexander in his eighth year as head coach, compiling a record of 8–1–1 (7–0–1 SoCon) and outscoring opponents 125 to 39. Georgia Tech played its home games at Grant Field.

In what was considered the best Georgia Tech season since 1918, the Tornado shared the SoCon title with the Tennessee Volunteers and NC State Wolfpack. Tech clinched the SoCon in the season's final game: upsetting rival Georgia's previously undefeated "dream and wonder team" which was nonetheless picked as a national champion by some selectors. Coach Alexander notably instituted "The Plan" to beat the rival Bulldogs; for weeks saving his regulars for practice.

The Tornado also upset the Alabama Crimson Tide, handing the Tide their first loss in over two seasons. One researcher ranks Tech as the year's best Southern defense. Tech suffered its only loss to Notre Dame, and held Vanderbilt to a scoreless tie.

Before the season
Tech was coming off the weakest season in coach William Alexander's tenure.

Schedule

Season summary

Week 1: V. M. I.

Sources:

To open the season, Tech defeated VMI 7–0. The Cadets played strongly for two quarters, but were near collapse by game's end. Al Barnes starred for VMI and Stumpy Thomason starred for Tech. "The V. M. I. team tried every brand of football they knew. But it was useless against the Tech defense and offense." The lone score came from Warner Mizell.

The starting lineup was: Crowley (left end), Thrash (left tackle), Martin (left guard), Pund (center), Drennon (right guard), Hood (right tackle), Waddey (right end), Smith (quarterback), Parham (left halfback), Horn (right halfback), Randolph (fullback).

Week 2: Tulane

Sources:

On a sloppy, wet field, the Tornado beat Tulane 13–6 despite many publications calling the game a "toss-up". Tech's first score came after a fumble recovery when Stumpy Thomason scored. In the second quarter, Bill Banker "zigzagged through the entire Tech defense" for an 80-yard touchdown. Rain fell at halftime and for the entire third quarter. In the fourth quarter, Thomason had another, 10-yard touchdown.

On the 11th, 15,000 gathered at Grant Field to pay tribute to Charles Lindbergh.

The starting lineup was: Crowley (left end), Watkins (left tackle), Westbrook (left guard), Rusk (center), Drennon (right guard), Speer (right tackle), Waddey (right end), Durant (quarterback), Mizell (left halfback), Thomason (right halfback), Randolph (fullback).

Week 3: Alabama

Sources:

In the biggest upset of the young Southern Conference season, Georgia Tech defeated Wallace Wade's defending national champion Alabama Crimson Tide 13–0. The loss snapped Alabama's 24-game unbeaten streak. Alabama's line was exceptionally heavy, averaging some 200 pounds.

Alabama had the upper hand in the first quarter, advancing the ball steadily to Tech's 14-yard line before being stopped on downs. The Jackets tipped the scale with a drive in the second quarter, highlighted by a 30-yard touchdown run by Stumpy Thomason. After a scoreless, see-sawing second half, the last touchdown was scored by Warner Mizell in the final minute.

The starting lineup was: Crowley (left end), Thrash (left tackle), Martin (left guard), Pund (center), Drennon (right guard), Hood (right tackle), Waddey (right end), Durant (quarterback), Parham (left halfback), Thomason (right halfback), Randolph (fullback).

Week 4: North Carolina

Sources:

In the fourth week of play, Tech defeated the North Carolina Tar Heels 13–0. Tech's defensive line had a stellar game, several times thwarting the Tar Heel as it approached the goal. The first touchdown came in the second quarter, after a drive using fullback Randolph on several line plunges. A lateral pass sent captain Ed Crowley over for the score. In the fourth quarter, Stumpy Thomason had a 75-yard touchdown.

The starting lineup was: Bullard (left end), Watkins (left tackle), Westbrook (left guard), Ruck (center), Martin (right guard), Hood (right tackle), Waddey (right end), Schulman (quarterback), Mizell (left halfback), Fitzgerald (right halfback), Devaughn (fullback).

Week 5: at Notre Dame

Sources:

At Carter Field, Knute Rockne's Notre Dame Fighting Irish easily defeated Georgia Tech 26–7 in one of the season's most important clashes. "Had Rockne willed it the score might have doubled;"  and "only the able punting of Mizell...prevented a greater victory for the Irish."

Rockne started the game with substitutes, and sent in his regulars to start the second quarter. A 12-yard off-tackle run, a 25-yard pass, and an 11-yard gain on a double pass preceded a touchdown.  The Irish led just 6–0 at the half. In the second half the Irish poured it on; the lone score from Tech was by Stumpy Thomason after a blocked Irish punt.

The starting lineup was: Crowley (left end), Hood (left tackle), Martin (left guard), Pund (center), Drennon (right guard), Watkins (right tackle), Waddey (right end), Durant (quarterback), Thomason (left halfback), Mizell (right halfback), Randolph (fullback).

Week 6: at Vanderbilt

A wet field and a strong defense, ranked by one researcher as best in the South, helped Tech reassert itself and held the Vanderbilt Commodores to a scoreless tie, despite the Commodores having the upper hand in play.

With the recent loss to Notre Dame, Tech had been overshadowed before the game by rival Georgia and its national championship bid. A strong game had been predicted, showcasing each team's backfield stars in Stumpy Thomason of Tech and Bill Spears of Vanderbilt.  The high-flying attack of quarterback Spears led one writer to say Vandy produced "almost certainly the legit top Heisman candidate in Spears, if there had been a Heisman Trophy to award in 1927."

The starting lineup was: Crowley (left end), Thrash (left tackle), Drennon (left guard), Pund (center), Martin (right guard), Hood (right tackle), Waddey (right end), Durant (quarterback), Mizell (left halfback), Thomason (right halfback), Randolph (fullback).

Week 7: LSU

Starting the game with second-string men only to send them in later and add 20 points, Tech crushed coach Mike Donahue's LSU Tigers 23–0. "The game was devoid of thrills". The first touchdown came late in the third quarter, when Randolph scored behind right tackle.

The starting lineup was: Bullard (left end), Thrash (left tackle), Lillard (left guard), Rusk (center), Westbrook (right guard), Hood (right tackle), Holland (right end), Smith (quarterback), Parham (left halfback), Horn (right halfback), Randolph (fullback).

Week 8: Oglethorpe
The Oglethorpe Stormy Petrels led the Tornado through three quarters 7–6, threatening to upset Tech just as it had last year. Oglethorpe scored on a Stumpy Thomason fumble. Tech managed to survive the scare by pulling ahead 19–7 in the final quarter. Warner Mizell saved the day with two touchdowns.

Week 9: Auburn

Sources:

Tech easily beat the Auburn Tigers 18–0. Auburn did not win a game all year. Stumpy Thomason went over the line for the first score In the second half, Tech played its first string minus Thomason, and Tech scored two more touchdowns. Warner Mizell ran off tackle for 50 yards for the first, and had a 1-yard run for the second.

The starting lineup was: Bullard (left end), Hood (left tackle), Westbrook (left guard), Rusk (center), Lillard (right guard), Thrash (right tackle), Holland (right end), Smith (quarterback), Parham (left halfback), Thomason (right halfback), Oltz (fullback).

Week 10: Georgia

Sources:

Georgia Tech faced the undefeated and top-ranked in-state rival Georgia Bulldogs for the conference crown. The Bulldogs were known as the "Dream and Wonder team" and gave Yale its only loss. In the rain, Tech won 12–0. For the first time this year, neither of Georgia's ends Tom Nash nor Shiver played particularly well.

Prior to the game, Coach Alexander instituted "The Plan," splitting his team into two squads and playing mostly reserves for four weeks. The regulars practiced for the upcoming Georgia contest. Grant Field was expected to be filled to capacity, the largest crowd ever in the south. One account read "And never in the history of athletics in the Southland has there been an occasion so momentous as this. The football championship of the South and as some may justifiably figure, the nation, will be decided on Saturday in the capital city and native sons will decide it."

Tech's first touchdown came on a pass from Warner Mizell to quarterback Bob Durant. The second one came shortly after Stumpy Thomason returned an interception 57 yards to Georgia's 22-yard line. Thomason scored on a 13-yard end run.

The starting lineup was: Crowley (left end), Watkins (left tackle), Westbrook (left guard), Pund (center), Drennon (right guard), Speer (right tackle), Waddey (right end), Durant (quarterback), Mizell (left halfback), Read (right halfback), Randolph (fullback).

Post season
The defeat of Georgia netted Tech the Southern title. Several Tech players received postseason honors. Tackle Frank Speer, Center Peter Pund, and Halfbacks Warner Mizell and Stumpy Thomason were all selected All-Southern.

Personnel

Depth chart
The following chart depicts Tech's lineup during the 1927 season with games started at the position shown in parenthesis. The chart mimics the offense after the jump shift has taken place.

Roster

Line

Backfield

Unlisted

See also
1927 Southern Conference football season
1927 College Football All-Southern Team
1927 College Football All-America Team

Notes

Endnotes

References
 
 
 

Georgia Tech
Georgia Tech Yellow Jackets football seasons
Southern Conference football champion seasons
Georgia Tech Golden Tornado football